The 2012 Misano Superbike World Championship round was the seventh round of the 2012 Superbike World Championship season and the sixth round of the 2012 Supersport World Championship season. It took place on the weekend of June 8–10, 2012 at Misano World Circuit Marco Simoncelli, in Misano Adriatico, Italy.

Superbike

Race 1 classification

Race 2 classification

Supersport

Race classification

External links
 The official website of the Superbike World Championship

Misano Superbike World Championship
Misano